Lyne Beaumont (born January 23, 1978 in Quebec City) is a Canadian competitor in synchronized swimming and Olympic medalist.

She participated on the Canadian team that received a bronze medal in synchronized team at the 2000 Summer Olympics in Sydney, Australia.

External links
Olympic Info

1978 births
Living people
Canadian synchronized swimmers
Olympic bronze medalists for Canada
Olympic synchronized swimmers of Canada
Synchronized swimmers at the 2000 Summer Olympics
Olympic medalists in synchronized swimming
Medalists at the 2000 Summer Olympics
20th-century Canadian women
21st-century Canadian women